Albrecht Achilles may refer to:
Albrecht III Achilles, Elector of Brandenburg (1414–1486)
Albrecht Achilles (Korvettenkapitän) (1914–1943), U-boat commander